The mannerist architecture and sculpture in Poland have two major traditions: Polish-Italian and Dutch-Flemish, that dominated in northern Poland. The Silesian mannerism of South-Western Poland was largely influenced by Bohemian and German mannerism, while the Pomeranian mannerism of North-Western Poland was influenced by Gothic tradition and Northern German mannerism. The Jews in Poland adapted patterns of Italian and Polish mannerism to their own tradition. The mannerist complex of Kalwaria Zebrzydowska and mannerist City of Zamość are UNESCO World Heritage Sites.

Lublin region created its own style with folk motives (Kazimierz Dolny), while the urban mannerism in Greater Poland replaced the Gothic gables with Italian style arcades, tympanums, friezes and pillars in tuscan order (Poznań). Warsaw, as one of the main cities of the Polish-Lithuanian Commonwealth and due to its role as seat of Parliament and King, was a place of meetings of cultures. The mannerist architecture in the city was a combination of many types of mannerist traditions.

The Bohemian mannerism had also large influence on the architecture and sculpture in Poland. This concerned not only the lands that were part of the Kingdom of Bohemia, like Silesia. Bohemian mannerism in Silesia joined the Prague renaissance with its brunelleschian arcades (inspired by Queen Anna Jagiellon's Belvedere in Prague, 1535–1537) and German influences originating from the late Gothic (steep gable with renaissance decoration).

Greater Poland Voivodeship

Lublin Voivodeship

Lubusz Voivodeship

Łódź Voivodeship

Masovian Voivodeship

See also
List of mannerist structures in Northern Poland
List of mannerist structures in Southern Poland

Notes and references

Mannerist architecture in Poland